Agnaldo Liz Souza (born 7 June 1968) is a Brazilian football coach and former player who played as a central defender. He is the current head coach of Jacobinense.

Playing career
Known as Agnaldo during his playing days, he was born in Florianópolis, Santa Catarina, and began his career with hometown side Figueirense in 1986. He moved to Vitória in 1991, being a regular starter before joining Grêmio in 1993.

Ahead of the 1995 season, Agnaldo signed a contract with Flamengo, but featured sparingly. He moved to Guarani in 1996, playing in only one match before subsequently returning to Vitória.

In 1997, Agnaldo agreed to a deal with Palmeiras, remaining at the club until 2000.

Managerial career
Shortly after retiring, Liz became a manager and took over Tubarão FC. On 27 December 2003, he took over former side Vitória, winning the 2004 Campeonato Baiano but being sacked on 30 June.

Liz was named in charge of Guarani in the Série A on 24 August 2004, but was dismissed on 4 October, with the club in the last position. He then returned to Tubarão for the 2005 campaign, before being named manager of Ituano on 26 February; he only managed the side one match before resigning six days later.

Liz returned to Tubarão once again before taking over CSA in February 2006. He was sacked by the latter in April, and worked for a brief period at Comercial-SP in the first months of the 2007 season.

On 6 February 2007, Liz was appointed Sampaio Corrêa manager, but was relieved of his duties on 9 March, after the club's elimination from the first phase of the Campeonato Maranhense. He took over Pelotas on 4 May, before being named at the helm of Catanduvense on 19 October.

Liz managed Itumbiara during the 2008 season, and later worked at Coruripe before returning to Catanduvense on 3 June 2009. The following 25 January, he was appointed manager of Atlético Alagoinhas.

Liz left Alagoinhas on 17 February 2010 to take over Rio Claro, and later was ahead of Campinense during the 2011 season. On 24 October 2011, he was named manager of Fluminense de Feira for the 2012 season, but was sacked on 15 February.

On 24 July 2012, Liz was appointed in charge of Guarany de Sobral, but resigned on 20 August.

On 22 May 2017, after spending two years managing the Santa Catarina Athletes Union, Liz was presented at Hercílio Luz, but was dismissed by the club on 31 August.

On 19 March 2020, Liz was fired from Vitória after the club closed the under-23 team. He later returned to Atlético Alagoinhas, but left the club on 19 October as their financial problems worsened.

He won the 2022 Campeonato Baiano with the side before being named manager of Série C side Altos on 11 April 2022.

On 26 April 2022, after just two matches in charge, Liz was sacked by Altos.

Honours

Player
Vitória
Campeonato Baiano: 1992

Grêmio
Copa do Brasil: 1994

Palmeiras
Copa do Brasil: 1998
Copa Mercosur: 1998
Copa Libertadores: 1999
Torneio Rio – São Paulo: 2000
Copa dos Campeões: 2000

Manager
Vitória
Campeonato Baiano: 2004

Atlético Alagoinhas
Campeonato Baiano: 2022

References

External links

1968 births
Living people
Sportspeople from Florianópolis
Brazilian footballers
Association football defenders
Campeonato Brasileiro Série A players
Campeonato Brasileiro Série B players
Figueirense FC players
Esporte Clube Vitória players
Grêmio Foot-Ball Porto Alegrense players
CR Flamengo footballers
Guarani FC players
Sociedade Esportiva Palmeiras players
Fluminense FC players
América Futebol Clube (MG) players
Olaria Atlético Clube players
União São João Esporte Clube players
Brazilian football managers
Campeonato Brasileiro Série A managers
Campeonato Brasileiro Série C managers
Campeonato Brasileiro Série D managers
Esporte Clube Vitória managers
Guarani FC managers
Ituano FC managers
Centro Sportivo Alagoano managers
Comercial Futebol Clube (Ribeirão Preto) managers
Sampaio Corrêa Futebol Clube managers
Esporte Clube Pelotas managers
Itumbiara Esporte Clube managers
Rio Claro Futebol Clube managers
Campinense Clube managers
Fluminense de Feira Futebol Clube managers
Associação Atlética de Altos managers
Sociedade Desportiva Juazeirense managers